Robert Nelson Cornelius Nix Sr. (August 9, 1898 – June 22, 1987) was an American politician who served in the United States House of Representatives from 1958 until 1979. He was the first African American to represent Pennsylvania in the House of Representatives. The Robert N. C. Nix Federal Building in Philadelphia, Pennsylvania is named in his honor.

Early life
Born in Orangeburg, South Carolina, he attended Townsend Harris High School in New York City and graduated from Lincoln University (Pennsylvania) in 1921.  He received his law degree from the University of Pennsylvania and began practicing in Philadelphia. After entering private practice, Nix became active in the Democratic Party as a committeeman from the fourth ward in 1932. He became a special assistant deputy attorney general of Pennsylvania in 1934 and delegate to the 1956 Democratic National Convention.

United States House of Representatives
In 1958, he defeated two opponents in a special election to fill a congressional vacancy left by Earl Chudoff in the House of Representatives. An elected official who rarely wanted or attracted widespread publicity, he supported mostly liberal legislation. He was reelected 10 times. He worked for the passage of the landmark legislation promoting the American Civil Rights Movement and privately sought to prevent the House from denying Rep. Adam Clayton Powell his seat in 1967.  In 1962, he became the first member of congress to knowingly meet with gay activists, when he invited Frank Kameny to his office. In 1975, he introduced an amendment to the Foreign Military Sales Act requiring the Defense Department to provide the U.S. Congress with information on identities of agents who negotiate arms sales for American firms.

Committee service
Congressman Nix served on the Veterans' Affairs Committee, the Foreign Affairs Committee and the Committee on Merchant Marine and Fisheries. He was the chairman of the Committee on the Post Office and Civil Service and the chairman of the Subcommittee on International Economic Policy.  Congressman Nix served 20 years before losing to William H. Gray III in the primary in 1978.

Family
Congressman Nix's son, Robert N. C. Nix Jr., became the first African American to be elected to statewide office in Pennsylvania when he was elected to the Pennsylvania Supreme Court.

Legacy

In 1985, the United States court house and post office building in Philadelphia was renamed the Robert N. C. Nix, Sr. Federal Building and United States Post Office in honor of Nix.

Famous quote
 "Be prepared, be sharp, be careful, and use the King's English well. And you can forget all the [other rules] unless you remember one more: Get paid."

See also
 List of African-American United States representatives

References

External links
 

|-

|-

1898 births
1987 deaths
20th-century American politicians
African-American lawyers
African-American members of the United States House of Representatives
African-American people in Pennsylvania politics
Democratic Party members of the United States House of Representatives from Pennsylvania
Lincoln University (Pennsylvania) alumni
People from Orangeburg, South Carolina
Politicians from Philadelphia
Townsend Harris High School alumni
University of Pennsylvania Law School alumni
20th-century African-American politicians
African-American men in politics